The Institute of Cardiovascular & Medical Sciences (ICAMS) is the purpose-built British Heart Foundation cardiovascular research facility at the University of Glasgow. The Director of the Institute is Rhian Touyz, MSc(Med), PhD. ICAMS is part of the College of Medical, Veterinary & Life Sciences, which was formed in 2010.



Description
There are around 175 research and support staff, as well as PhD & MD students (116 in 2017–18). Research is the primary purpose and activity of the Institute. Staff is currently focused on cardiac, vascular, and metabolic themes, as well as the emerging renal, stroke, and ornics themes.

Institute staff also run and contribute to the following post-graduate programmes:- MSc Cardiovascular Sciences, MSc Clinical Pharmacology, MSc Clinical Trials, and Stratified Medicine, MSc Sports & Exercise Science & Medicine, and MSc Stratified Medicine and Pharmacological Innovation.

References

2010 establishments in Scotland
Heart disease organizations
Medical and health organisations based in Scotland
Medical research institutes in the United Kingdom
Research institutes in Scotland
University of Glasgow